Naw Phaw Eh Htar (born 19 January 1996) is a Burmese actress and model. She gained popularity after starring in the 2019 thriller drama series The Missing Truth which brought her wider recognition.

Early life and education
Naw Phaw Eh Htar was born on 19 January 1996 in Taunggyi, Shan State, Myanmar to ethnic Pa'O-Karen  parent Khun Tin Lynn and his wife Naw Hsar Pho. She is the middle child among three siblings, having an older brother and a younger sister. She finished her primary and higher education in Taunggyi. She went on to attend Mandalay University of Foreign Languages. She graduated with B.A (French language) from MUFL in 2018 and also earned the Diploma in Business management from SHRM College in Singapore in 2019.

Career

Beginning as a model
She was picked the "Queen" (beauty queen) as a freshman at the university. Since then on, she had her chances to participate in opportunities that came her way, fueling her dream of building a career in the glamorous world of entertainment. After she graduated, she took part in many productions of music videos, photo shoots, wedding fairs as well as act in an educational web series meant for youths. She was selected brand model for SAI Cosmetix by Sai Sai Kham Leng. Her hard work as a model and acting in commercials was noticed by the film industry and soon, film casting offers came rolling in.

2018–present: Acting debut and rising popularity 
Rising to fame in 2018, she became an actress. She made her acting debut with a leading role in the MRTV-4 series The Missing Truth, alongside Kaung Myat San, Htoo Aung, Aung Ye Htike and May Myint Mo, aired on MRTV-4 in 2019. Her portrayal of the character Thudra earned praised by fans for her acting performance and character interpretation, and experienced a resurgence of popularity. The same year, she starred in the documentary series Mythical Myanmar Bagan, alongside May Toe Khine. The documentary is travel across exotic ancient city of Myanmar, Bagan to discover
culture, heritage and beauty.

In 2019, she made her big-screen debut in the film Ma Phae Wah, where she played the main role with Khar Ra, Kohtee Aramboy, Naraphat Stary and Patricia. The film is the collaboration with Thailand and directed by Pakphum Wonjinda which based on the story of Ma Phae Wah.

Brand Ambassadorships
In 2019, she was appointed as brand ambassador for Telenor Myanmar, Sunkist and Free Fire in Myanmar.

Political activities
Following the 2021 Myanmar coup d'état, Naw Phaw Eh Htar was active in the anti-coup movement both in person at rallies and through social media. Denouncing the military coup, she has taken part in protests since February. She joined the "We Want Justice" three-finger salute movement. The movement was launched on social media, and many celebrities have joined the movement.

On 4 April 2021, warrants for her arrest were issued under section 505 (a) of the penal code by the State Administration Council for speaking out against the military coup. Along with several other celebrities, she was charged with calling for participation in the Civil Disobedience Movement (CDM) and damaging the state's ability to govern, with supporting the Committee Representing Pyidaungsu Hluttaw, and with generally inciting the people to disturb the peace and stability of the nation.

On 29 June 2021, the state-owned MRTV News announced that a total of 24 artists including Naw Phaw and more have charges against them dropped.

Filmography

Film (Cinema)

Television series

References

External links
 
 

Living people
1996 births
Burmese film actresses
Burmese female models
21st-century Burmese actresses
People from Taunggyi